Zalaba is a village and municipality in the Levice District in the Nitra Region of Slovakia.

History
In historical records the village was first mentioned in 1349.

Geography
The village lies at an altitude of 124 metres and covers an area of 7.354 km². It has a population of about 170 people.

Ethnicity
The village is approximately 86% Magyar and 14% Slovak.

Facilities
The village has a public library and football pitch.

External links
https://web.archive.org/web/20071027094149/http://www.statistics.sk/mosmis/eng/run.html

Villages and municipalities in Levice District